Wilkingia is an extinct genus of fossil bivalve molluscs that lived from the Early Carboniferous (Visean) to the Late Permian (Changhsingian) in Asia, Europe, North and South America (Río del Peñón Formation of Argentina, Piauí Formation of Brazil and Cerro El Arbol Formation of Chile).

References

Further reading
 Fossils (Smithsonian Handbooks) by David Ward (Page 113)

Praecardiida
Prehistoric bivalve genera
Carboniferous bivalves
Carboniferous Chile
Permian bivalves
Paleozoic animals of Asia
Paleozoic animals of Europe
Paleozoic animals of North America
Carboniferous animals of South America
Carboniferous Argentina
Fossils of Argentina
Carboniferous Brazil
Fossils of Brazil
Permian animals of South America
Permian Argentina
Permian Chile
Fossils of Chile
Fossil taxa described in 1959